The Lake Country Trail is a paved multipurpose rail trail in Waukesha County, Wisconsin. It stretches  from the intersection of W Jefferson St. and S Franklin St. in Oconomowoc to the Landsberg Center Trailhead on Golf Rd. in Pewaukee. It also passes through the Wisconsin communities of Summit and Delafield.

The trail follows the old Milwaukee–Watertown interurban line, operated by The Milwaukee Electric Railway and Light Company (TMER&L). The line was abandoned and the rails torn out in the early 1940s; however, overhead electric lines operated by the Wisconsin Electric Power Company still remain.

References

External links 
 Trail map

Rail trails in Wisconsin
Waukesha County, Wisconsin